David Donaldson (born 28 December 1941) is an English former professional footballer who played in the Football League, as a defender. suffered in his final years with severe dementia and died in a care home on 30th March 2022 aged 80.

References

1941 births
Living people
Footballers from Hillingdon
English footballers
Association football defenders
Walton & Hersham F.C. players
Wimbledon F.C. players
English Football League players